The Sri Lankan Ambassador to the Soviet Union was the Sri Lankan envoy in Moscow (Ulitsa Shepkhina 24, Soviet Union) with concurrent, nonresident Diplomatic accreditation in Budapest, Bukarest, Prague, Warsaw and East Berlin.

History 
Diplomatic relations between the Soviet Union and Sri Lanka were established on February 19, 1957, and ceased following the breakup of the Soviet Union in 1991.

Ambassadors

See also 
 Sri Lankan Ambassador to Russia
 List of heads of missions from Sri Lanka

References 

Sri Lanka
Rusia